State Route 420 (SR 420) is a  east-west state highway in Gibson County, Tennessee, connecting the community of Fruitland with the town of Gibson.

Route description

SR 420 begins in Fruitland at an intersection with US 45W/SR 5. It heads east through farmland and rural areas for several miles before entering Gibson and coming to an end at an intersection with SR 186 just north of downtown. The entire route of SR 420 is a rural two-lane highway.

Major intersections

References

420
Transportation in Gibson County, Tennessee